The 1936 United States presidential election in Virginia took place on November 3, 1936. Voters chose 11 representatives, or electors to the Electoral College, who voted for president and vice president.

Virginia voted for the Democratic nominee, incumbent President Franklin D. Roosevelt, over the Republican nominee, Kansas Governor Alf Landon. Roosevelt ultimately won the national election with 60.80% of the vote.  Roosevelt carried Virginia with the largest percentage since 1832, and no candidate has been in able to match his performance in the state after this election. , this is the last election in which Page County voted for a Democratic presidential candidate.

Results

Results by county

References

Virginia
1936
1936 Virginia elections